Malchus was the servant of the Jewish High Priest Caiaphas who participated in the arrest of Jesus as written in the four gospels. According to the Bible, one of the disciples, Simon Peter, being armed with a sword, cut off the servant's ear in an attempt to prevent the arrest of Jesus.

Biblical accounts

Also, Luke is the only gospel that says Jesus healed the servant. This was Jesus' last recorded miracle prior to his resurrection.

The relevant passages in the Gospels of John and Luke, KJV, read:

James F. McGrath suggests that this account reflects an event that did happen, in that early Christians would hardly have invented a story portraying themselves as violent.

Later in Chapter 18, John records that a relative of Malchus witnessed Peter's assault in the Garden of Gethsemane, and identified Peter as a follower of Christ. Peter denied this.

Early church father, Jerome, cites a post-resurrection appearance of Jesus to Malchus, quoting a passage from the lost "gospel according to the Hebrews."  "And when the Lord had given the linen cloth to the servant of the priest, he went to James and appeared to him."

Literature and arts

Thornton Wilder wrote a short play entitled, "The Servant's Name Was Malchus"; it appears in the collection The Angel That Troubled the Waters and Other Plays.

The Fire Gospel, a 2008 novel by Michel Faber, centers on the discovery of the fictional lost gospel of Malchus.

Malchus is portrayed by Paul Brightwell in the 2013 TV miniseries The Bible.

In the 2004 Mel Gibson film The Passion of the Christ, Malchus is represented as an armed member of the temple guard. In this depiction, Jesus heals Malchus' wounded ear, leaving the latter to stay behind sitting dumbfounded in a state of disbelief, suggesting a possible conversion to Christianity.

Isak Dinesen in The Deluge at Norderney (the first of Seven Gothic Tales) relates a story about Simon Peter wherein he uses the memory of cutting off Malchus' ear "to control his temper".

Touch by John Ferguson portrays Malchus as a Roman soldier sent by Pilate to spy on the Sanhedrin. Malchus is then sent by Caiaphas to spy on Jesus and his followers.

See also
 Sword of Saint Peter

Notes

External links

 

Servants
People in the canonical gospels
Saint Peter
Caiaphas
Ancient slaves
Miracles of Jesus